Julen är här is a 1989 Christmas album by Tommy Körberg.

Track listing

Side A
Julen är här - (duet with Sissel Kyrkjebø)
Gläns över sjö och strand
Klang, min vackra bjällra
Ser du stjärnan i det blå (When You Wish upon a Star)
Minns du hans ögon
Julpolska (Julen den glada går åter omkring på Jorden) with Orsa spelmän

Side B
O helga natt (Cantique de Noël) (Minuit, Chrétiens)
Himlens hemlighet (Mary's Boy Child)
Sång till Karl-Bertil Jonsson, 14 år
Jul, jul, strålande jul
Låt julen förkunna (Happy Xmas (War Is Over) - with Sissel Kyrkjebø.
Frälsarbarn

Chart positions

References 

Tommy Körberg albums
1989 Christmas albums
Christmas albums by Swedish artists
Schlager Christmas albums